The Ford City Veterans Bridge is a girder bridge connecting Ford City and North Buffalo Township, Pennsylvania. It was constructed in 2000 to replace a 1914 structure. The structure was one of the first in the nation to use a new type of high-performance, weather resistant steel.

See also
List of crossings of the Allegheny River

References
National Bridges Article
Modern Steel

Bridges over the Allegheny River
Bridges completed in 2000
2000 establishments in Pennsylvania
Bridges in Armstrong County, Pennsylvania
Road bridges in Pennsylvania
Steel bridges in the United States
Girder bridges in the United States